Volokonovka is the name of several inhabited localities in Russia.

Urban localities
Volokonovka, Volokonovsky District, Belgorod Oblast, a work settlement in Volokonovsky District of Belgorod Oblast

Rural localities
Volokonovka, Chernyansky District, Belgorod Oblast, a selo in Chernyansky District, Belgorod Oblast
Volokonovka, Voronezh Oblast, a selo in Bondarevskoye Rural Settlement of Kantemirovsky District of Voronezh Oblast